Jessica O'Connell (born 10 February 1989 in Calgary) is a Canadian athlete competing primarily in long-distance events. She represented her country at the 2016 World Indoor Championships finishing ninth.

In July 2016 she was officially named to Canada's Olympic team in the 5000 meter event.

Competition record

1Representing the Americas

Personal bests
Outdoor
1500 metres – 4:10.61 (Burnaby BC 2019)
One mile – 4:30.75 (Burnaby 2014)
3000 metres – 8:46.61 (Cork, Ireland 2018)
5000 metres – 15:06.44 (Palo Alto 2015)
Indoor
3000 metres – 8:46 50 (New York 2019) Canadian Record

References

1989 births
Living people
Commonwealth Games competitors for Canada
Athletes (track and field) at the 2014 Commonwealth Games
Pan American Games track and field athletes for Canada
Athletes (track and field) at the 2015 Pan American Games
Athletes (track and field) at the 2019 Pan American Games
Canadian female long-distance runners
Athletes (track and field) at the 2016 Summer Olympics
Olympic track and field athletes of Canada
Universiade medalists in athletics (track and field)
Universiade silver medalists for Canada
Pan American Games silver medalists for Canada
Pan American Games medalists in athletics (track and field)
Medalists at the 2017 Summer Universiade
Medalists at the 2019 Pan American Games
20th-century Canadian women
21st-century Canadian women